Sreeraama Pattaabhishekam  is a 1962 Indian Malayalam-language film, directed by G. K. Ramu and produced by P. Subramaniam. The film stars Prem Nazir, Vasanthi, Kaviyoor Ponnamma, Thikkurissy Sukumaran Nair and Prem Nawas. The film had musical score by Br. Lakshmanan. The film was dubbed into Hindi as Prabhu Jai Shri Ram.

Cast
Prem Nazir as Sree Raman
Vasanthi as Seetha/Ahalya
Kaviyoor Ponnamma  as Mandodari
Thikkurissy Sukumaran Nair as Dasaradhan
Prem Nawas as Lakshmanan
GK Pillai as Vishwamithran
Miss Kumari as Kaikeyi
K. V. Shanthi as Surpanakha/Kamavalli
T. K. Balachandran as Bharathan
Aranmula Ponnamma as Kausalya
Jose Prakash as Janakaraja
Kaduvakulam Antony as Badan
Kottarakkara Sreedharan Nair as Ravanan
Vanchiyoor Radha as Mallika
Adoor Pankajam as Manthara
Hari as Shatrughnan
S. P. Pillai as Vaidyar
Sukumari dance appearance in song sequence

Soundtrack
The music was composed by Br. Lakshmanan and lyrics were written by Thirunayinaarkurichi Madhavan Nair. Slokas taken from Thunchathu Ezhuthachan's Adhyathmaramayanam were also taken to the film.

References

External links
 

1962 films
1960s Malayalam-language films
Films based on the Ramayana
Films scored by Br Lakshmanan